Guy Nulens (born 27 October 1957) is a Belgian former racing cyclist. He rode in nineteen Grand Tours between 1980 and 1994, fifteen of which were Tour de France starts.

Major results

1979
 1st Overall Tour de Liège
1st Stages 1 & 5
 1st Trofeo Alcide Degasperi
 1st Stage 5 Étoile des Espoirs
 2nd Circuit de Wallonie
 3rd Flèche Ardennaise
1981
 9th Overall Tour de Suisse
1st Stage 5
1983
 5th Tour of Flanders
1984
 1st Stage 7a Critérium du Dauphiné Libéré
 1st Stage 2 (TTT) Paris–Nice
 4th Binche–Tournai–Binche
1985
 1st  Overall Étoile de Bessèges
1st Stage 2
1986
 1st Stage 7 Tour de Suisse
1987
 6th Overall Ronde van Nederland
1988
 7th Grand Prix de Wallonie
 8th Overall Tour of Belgium
1989
 7th Overall Vuelta a Andalucía
 9th Overall Tour de Trump
1990
 1st Stage 2 (TTT) Tour de France
 5th Overall Vuelta a Andalucía
1992
 1st Stage 4 (TTT) Tour de France
1993
 2nd Road race, National Road Championships
1994
 10th Gent–Wevelgem

Grand Tour general classification results timeline

References

External links
 

1957 births
Living people
Belgian male cyclists
Sportspeople from Hasselt
Cyclists from Limburg (Belgium)
Tour de Suisse stage winners
20th-century Belgian people